Røsvik or Røsvika is a village in the municipality of Sørfold in Nordland county, Norway. Røsvik had 209 residents in 2007, but it has since fallen below 200. The village is home to a nursing home, a psychiatric hospital, and Røsvik Church. It is now also home to YWAM Nordland.

References

Sørfold
Villages in Nordland
Populated places of Arctic Norway